Taylor Wright-Sanson (born August 17, 1991) is an American unicyclist best known for bringing trials and street style unicycling to the circus ring.

During the summers of 2006-2009 he performed unicycle stunts in nearly 300 shows with Circus Smirkus.

He won the first national unicycle competition he entered: the Trials Competition at the Ottawa Unicycle Invasion in 2008 (OUI '08), held in Ottawa, Ontario, Canada.

He is one of the only unicyclists to consistently land a backflip dismount off the unicycle, having performed the stunt hundreds of times during performances.

Video appearances 
 Inner Balance

External links 
Circus Smirkus

References

Unicyclists
American circus performers
Living people
1991 births